James Barry Jones (born November 20, 1940) was a Canadian politician. He served in the Legislative Assembly of British Columbia from 1987 to 1996, as a NDP member for the constituency of Burnaby North.

References

British Columbia New Democratic Party MLAs
1940 births
Living people
People from Penticton